Sicco van Goslinga (Herbaijum, Friesland, 1664—Dongjum, 12 October 1731) was a Dutch statesman and diplomat, who served as gedeputeerde te velde (deputy-in-the-field, a kind of political commissar) of the States-General of the Dutch Republic with John Churchill, 1st Duke of Marlborough during his campaigns in Flanders in the War of the Spanish Succession. His memoirs form an important source of information for historians of the period.

Biography

Family life
Goslinga married Jeanette (Joanne) Isabelle baroness thoe Schwartzenberg und Hohenlansberg, vrijvrouwe of Ameland, at Ballum, Friesland, on 12 June 1692. They had five daughters, one of whom, Anna Dodonea, would marry Unico Wilhelm van Wassenaer.

Career
After studies at the University of Franeker and the University of Utrecht he became Grietman of Franekeradeel in 1688, a function he would hold until his death. This made him a regent and put him in line for all kinds of functions on a provincial level in the province of Friesland. He also represented that province in the States-General and in the Raad van State (Council of State) on many occasions (see "List of functions" in the External links).

As a member of the Council of State (which was the most important executive organ of the Republic in the military field, especially after the Second Stadtholderless Period had started) he became a gedeputeerde te velde for Friesland at the headquarters of the Duke of Marlborough from 1706 until Marlborough's dismissal in 1711. As such he was charged with advising Marlborough, and with keeping an eye on him, as agreed when Marlborough was made lieutenant-captain-general of the army of the Republic in 1702. The Dutch deputies-in-the-field had the right to veto Marlborough's tactical decisions if they thought the interests of the Republic demanded it, and this had led to much friction with Marlborough in previous years. Goslinga, however, proved cooperative generally and managed to provide a positive contribution during the battles of Ramillies, Oudenaarde, and Malplaquet.
Though not a general, he was authorized to give orders to Dutch commanders at these battles. At the Battle of Oudenaarde he took it upon himself to throw a Dutch division into battle at a decisive moment. At Malplquet he was involved in combat from start to finish and, along with the Prince of Orange, personally led the attacks on the French entrenchments. His horse was shot out from under him during one of these attacks. He also personally ordered up reinforcements when the second Dutch assault on the left flank faltered. Struck hard by the slaughter among the Dutch infantry at Malplaquet, he wrote to Anthonie Heinsius, Grand Pensionary of Holland, that:

Yesterday, the princes and generals saw the left flank on the battlefield. They saw with horror how our men lay against the field fortifications and entrenchments, still in the rank orders as they had fallen. Our infantry is dilapidated and ruined and will never return. [...] The Count of Tilly will draw up a list [of the dead and wounded] in accordance with the advice of the generals and colonels. [...] It is undesirable for us to risk the cause of the Republic. There were times when I thought God would bring us to the brink of ruin, but the good god has saved the Republic at the highest price of a stream of blood, shed by the very bravest of this world.

Though Winston Churchill had no high opinion of Goslinga's military abilities he nevertheless extensively used his memoirs as a source. To illustrate the good rapport between Marlborough and Goslinga, Churchill mentions the anecdote in which they shared Marlborough's cloak to sleep on after the battle of Ramillies. Although Sicco van Goslinga was generally positive about Marlborough and considered him a genius, he was also critical. Marlborough was good at playing sincerity, had excessive ambition, and was grudgingly greedy. Although brave, according to Van Goslinga, Marlborough also lacked a strong character. He wrote:

He was sometimes indecisive, especially on the eve of some great undertaking, shrank from difficulties, and sometimes allowed himself to be beaten down by adversity. Maybe that's because he doesn't handle fatigue very well. He knows little about military discipline and gives too much freedom to the soldiers, causing them to commit horrible excesses.

Goslinga served as plenipotentiary for the Republic at the peace negotiations, leading up to the Treaty of Utrecht (1713). After the conclusion of the peace he served as extraordinary envoy of the Republic to the court of Louis XIV of France in 1714 and 1715. In 1728 he represented the Republic at the congress of Soissons about outstanding European diplomatic issues (like the status of Gibraltar).

Until his death he was involved in Dutch politics. He supported the appointment of William IV, Prince of Orange as stadtholder of Groningen in 1719.

Works
  (1857) Mémoires relatifs à la Guerre de succession de 1706-1709 et 1711, de Sicco van Goslinga, publiés par mm. U. A. Evertsz et G. H. M. Delprat, au nom de la Société d’histoire, d’archéologie et de linquistique de Frise, (Published by G.T.N. Suringar, 1857)
  (1978) Briefwisseling Tussen Simon Van Slingelandt En Sicco Van Goslinga 1697-1731,

References

Sources
  (2002) Marlborough: His Life and Times, University of Chicago Press, 
  (1995) The Treaties of the War of the Spanish Succession: An Historical and Critical Dictionary, Greenwood Publishing Group, p. 189
   (1999) De Heeren Van Den Raede: biografieën en groepsportret van de raadsheren van het Hof van Friesland (1499-1811), Uitgeverij Verloren, p. 347

External links
  Listing of official functions

1664 births
1731 deaths
18th-century Dutch people
Dutch politicians
People from Franekeradeel
University of Franeker alumni
Utrecht University alumni
Dutch army commanders in the War of the Spanish Succession
18th-century Dutch military personnel